Fepa 74 Stadium is a multi-use stadium in Bârlad. It is the home ground of Sporting Bârlad and Atletic Bârlad. It holds over 2,000 people.

References

Football venues in Romania
Bârlad
Buildings and structures in Vaslui County